Mleh I, also Meleh I, (before 1120 – Sis, May 15, 1175) was the eighth lord of Armenian Cilicia or “Lord of the Mountains” (1170–1175).

The accomplishments during the reign of his elder brother, Thoros II, placed Cilicia on a firm footing. But Mleh, whom Thoros II had expelled from Cilicia for converting to Islam, almost undid his brother's work. 

On the death of his brother, Mleh invaded Cilicia with the support of a contingent from Aleppo, which remained in his service and assisted him to drive out the Knights Templar and Greeks from the fortresses and, in 1173, the cities which they held in Cilicia. Soon after the death of Nur ed-Din (the emir of Aleppo), Mleh was overthrown by his nephew, Roupen III.

His early life
Mleh was the fourth son of Leo I, lord of Armenian Cilicia. The name and the origin of his mother are not known with certainty. It is possible that she was a daughter of Count Hugh I of Rethel, or she might have been the daughter of Gabriel of Melitene.

In the early summer of 1137, the Byzantine Emperor John II Komnenos came to Cilicia with a full force on his way to take Antioch; his army successively took Seleucia, Korikos, Tarsus, Mamistra, Adana, Tel Hamdoun (now Toprakkale in Turkey) and Anazarbus. Mleh and his two brothers, Stephen and the blind Constantine took refuge with their cousin, Count Joscelin II of Edessa. In Cilicia, the family castle of Vahka (today Feke in Turkey) held out for some weeks, but after its fall their father and two of their brothers, Roupen and Thoros, were captured. Leo I and his two sons were imprisoned in Constantinople where Leo I died shortly afterwards, and Roupen was blinded and later murdered. All Cilicia remained under Byzantine rule for eight years.

About the year 1143, Mleh's brother, Thoros escaped from Constantinople and recaptured the family stronghold of Vahka; Mleh and his brother Stephen joined him. One after another, Thoros reconquered Anazarbus, Adana, Sis (today Kozan in Turkey) and Pardzerpert (now Andırın in Turkey) from the Byzantines.

In 1164, Nur ed-Din struck at the Principality of Antioch and laid siege to the key-fortress of Harenc; Prince Bohemond III of Antioch called upon Thoros II to come to his rescue, and Mleh followed his brother. At the news of the coming of the Byzantine and Armenian troops, Nur ed-Din raised the siege, but Bohemond III decided to follow in pursuit; the armies made contact on August 10, near Artah. In the ensuing battle, Bohemond III fell into an ambush and found himself and his knights surrounded by the army of Mosul, but Thoros II and Mleh, who had been more cautious, escaped from the battlefield.

In the service of Nur ed-Din
Although Mleh had taken vows as a Templar, after a quarrel with Thoros II and an attempt to assassinate him, he fled to Nur ed-Din. Mleh converted to Islam from Armenian Apostolic Christianity.  This was to facilitate his plans with Nur ed-Din; afterwards, he held Cyrrhus as a fief from the Emir of Aleppo.

His brother died in 1168, leaving a child, Roupen II, to succeed him, under the regency of a Frankish lord called Thomas. But Mleh disputed the succession; early in 1170 Nur ed-Din lent him troops with which he was able not only to dethrone his nephew but also to invade the Cilician plain and take Mamistra, Adana and Tarsus from their Greek garrisons. The young Roupen III was followed by Mleh's men and murdered.

His rule
With Thoros's legitimate heir dead, Mleh embarked on a policy of conquest with cruel application of force. He beleaguered the Hethumids at Lampron (now Namrun Kalesi in Turkey), but in spite of a long siege his attempt to take this stronghold failed. Mleh then attacked the Templars at Baghras; Bohemond III of Antioch appealed to King Amalric I of Jerusalem, who marched up into Cilicia and temporarily, its seems, restored Imperial rule. But Mleh was irrepressible; a year or so later he routed at Tarsus the assembled forces of the governor Konstantinos Kalamanos, and sent him to Nur ed-Din, who held Konstantinos for heavy ransom.

On March 10, 1171 Amalric I left Acre for Constantinople where he made a treaty with the Emperor Manuel I Comnenos; it seems that they decided that a common action should be taken against Mleh. An expedition organized by the king after his return from Constantinople in 1171 was interrupted by Nur ed-Din's attack on Kerak (today Al Karak in Jordan).

In the summer of 1171, Mleh waylaid Count Stephen I of Sancerre as he passed through Cilicia from the Holy Land to Constantinople. In order to punish Mleh for his outrage against the count, Amalric I marched north into Cilicia in 1173; but the campaign achieved nothing except to check Mleh's further expansion. Mleh finally succeeded in 1173 in securing Manuel I's recognition of him as “Baron of Cilician Armenia” with whom now all Byzantine affairs in Cilicia were to be conducted.

On May 15, 1174, Nur ed-Din died; en event which brought an end to Mleh's source of power. Vulnerable and without an ally, members of Mleh's own inner circle of Armenian nobles, took the initiative and murdered him in Sis in 1175.

He was buried in Medzkar.

Marriage and child
Mleh married an unnamed daughter of Vasil of Gargar (a sister of the Catholicos Gregory).

He had one illegitimate child by his unknown mistress:
Grigor (? – January 28, 1209/January 27, 1210 or after)

Footnotes

Sources 
Ghazarian, Jacob G: The Armenian Kingdom in Cilicia during the Crusades: The Integration of Cilician Armenians with the Latins (1080–1393); RoutledgeCurzon (Taylor & Francis Group), 2000, Abingdon;

External links
The Barony of Cilician Armenia (Kurkjian's History of Armenia, Ch. 27)
Smbat Sparapet's Chronicle

1175 deaths
12th-century murdered monarchs
Converts to Islam from Christianity
Year of birth unknown
12th-century Armenian people
Armenian former Christians
Ethnic Armenian Muslims
Monarchs of the Rubenid dynasty